Thomas Avinger (Weslaco, Texas, September 28, 1928 – Houston, Texas, November 18, 2000) was an American composer, conductor and systems analyst for the oil industry.

Biography
Born in Weslaco, Texas, he taught himself to play the piano at the age of 19.  He attended Edinburg Junior College (which later became the University of Texas–Pan American and more recently became the University of Texas Rio Grande Valley).  He then graduated from Baylor University in 1952 with a Bachelor of Music degree and a Master of Music degree in 1957.  Between his college degrees (from September 1952 to June 1954), he was stationed with the United States Army at Fort Leonard Wood, Missouri, where he was the musical director of the Soldiers' Section of Special Services.

After completing his graduate work, he began working for the Humble Oil and Refining Company (now part of Exxon-Mobil, USA).  He spent the next forty years there as a systems analyst.  He was married to JoAnn Avinger for 45 years, and they had two sons, Erich and Peter.

Music

Avinger was comfortable with his career in technology while also composing music when possible, saying "I think I have the best of both worlds. I have the satisfaction of a corporate career that I enjoy and the pleasure of composing music and hearing it performed. One doesn't have to choose between the arts and business today."

Like the better-known Charles Ives, he was not a full-time musician or composer, yet he completed at least 50 musical works, including a one-act opera, a ballet suite, orchestral works with chorus, and various smaller works for chorus, piano, chamber ensembles, and art songs.  His musical style has been compared to Shostakovich's for its "lofty, inspiring melodies and startling romantic passages".

During his lifetime, his works were performed at Baylor University, Eastern Illinois University the Moores School of Music, by the Dallas Symphony Orchestra for a Composers Conference moderated by Darius Milhaud, and many churches and smaller venues in Texas.

As a performing musician, Avinger conducted and sang in numerous choirs, as was the assistant conductor of the Houston Symphony Chorale.

Compositions
Stage works
What Makes You So Grand?, musical comedy in two acts, 1948
The Stranger (Rupert Brooke play), opera in one act, 1951–52
Goblin Market, ballet, 1960

Instrumental and keyboard
Theme and Variations, piano, 1950
Variations on a Theme of Melancholy, wind septet, 1951
Introduction and Fugato, string quartet, 1954
First Piano Sonata, 1968
First Violin Sonata, 1968

Large choral works
The Song of Songs which is Solomon's (Song of Songs, oratorio, 1954–55, revised 1968
A Cantata for Christmastide, cantata, 1972

Short choral works
Psalm I, 1959
Love Came Down At Christmas (Christina Rossetti), 1959
Five Qumran Hymns, 1960

Solo voice
Dead Men's Love Rupert Brooke, 1950
The Treasure Rupert Brooke, 1951
Four Folk Songs from Green Grow the Lilacs, 1952
Miner Boy
Young Men Will Go Courtin'
Custer's Last Stand
Green Grow the Lilacs
The Man in the Closed Ward (Theodore Thieme), tenor and piano, 1953–54
The man in the closed ward
Mind metamorphosing color and light
Blind body closing in fright
The petals relax spasmodically
And the pretty heart of the flower is burned up
After Death (Christina Rossetti), 1958
Lucasta Et Cetera (Richard Lovelace), tenor and chamber ensemble, 1960
To Lucasta (Going beyond the Seas)
To Lucasta (Going to the Warres)
The Scrutinie (Why should you sweare)
Gratiana (Dauncing and Singing)
To Althea (Written from Prison)
Sonnet (When I by thy faire shape)

Footnotes

1928 births
2000 deaths
Systems analysis
American male composers
American composers
American male conductors (music)
People from Weslaco, Texas
20th-century American conductors (music)
20th-century American male musicians